Juzir may refer to:
 Juzir, Hormozgan
 Juzir, Lorestan